Irina Petrovna Tokmakova (née Manukova, 3 March 1929 — 5 April 2018) was a Soviet and Russian writer of children's books, a poet, playwright, and a translator of classic children's literature into Russian. Her translations of Tove Jansson, Astrid Lindgren and Kenneth Grahame's works were particularly renowned. She was a laureate of the State Prize of the Russian Federation for children's literature, and the Alexander Grin literary prize.

Life
Irina Tokmakova was born in Moscow to Perch Manukian (an Armenian, whose Russified name was Pyotr Manukov), an electrical engineer, and Lidia Diligenskaya, a paediatrician at a local orphanage.

During the Second World War, she and her sister were sent to Penza to stay with relatives. For a while, there was no news from her parents, but some time later, her mother's orphanage was evacuated to Penza, and her parents were able to join her. They lived in Penza till 1943, after which they returned to Moscow, where the orphanage was re-established.

Manukova graduated from high school with a gold medal in 1948. She had been writing poetry from her childhood onwards, but feeling that she lacked a literary talent, she decided to take up a career in languages. In 1953, she graduated from the philological department of the Moscow State University. She then entered a postgraduate programme in general and comparative linguistics, and began to work as an interpreter.

Manukova married Leo Tokmakov, an illustrator. Their son, Vasily Tokmakov, also became a writer of children's fiction.

Irina Tokmakova died in Moscow on 5 April 2018.

Career
The first literary translation into Russian undertaken by Tokmakova was a collection of Swedish folk songs for children. These had been sent to her by a visiting Swedish energy executive named Borgqvist, who had recognised her love for Swedish song. Initially, the translation was meant for her son, but Tokmakova's husband took it to a publishing house, which then printed it in the magazines Merry pictures and Murzilka.

The writers Samuil Marshak and Agniya Barto saw Tokmakova's works in Murzilka and encouraged her to write and publish more. Subsequently, Leo Tokmakov illustrated many of their books.

To join the Union of Soviet Writers, Tokmakova needed sponsorships from three members; Marshak, Boris Zakhoder and Valentin Berestov recommended her.

Her first book of poetry, illustrated by Leo Tokmakov, was titledTrees, and was published in 1962.

Tokmakova was able to travel abroad to attend international seminars and conferences on children's literature. She was a juror for the Hans Christian Andersen Award.

Selected works

Own writings

Translations

From English

From Swedish

From Uzbek

References

External links

 

1929 births
2018 deaths
20th-century Russian women writers
Russian children's writers
Russian women children's writers
Writers from Moscow
Russian-language poets
20th-century Russian poets
Moscow State University alumni
Translators to Russian
Translators from English
Translators from Swedish
Soviet children's writers
Collectors of fairy tales
Soviet dramatists and playwrights
Russian dramatists and playwrights
Russian women dramatists and playwrights
20th-century Russian dramatists and playwrights
Russian people of Armenian descent
Women folklorists
20th-century translators
Soviet women writers